Below are some notable researchers in cognitive science.

Computer science

Linguistics

Neuroscience

Philosophy

Psychology

Other categories
 Alfredo Ardila (neuroscience, neuropsychology, anthropology, evolution of cognition)
 Scott Atran (cognitive anthropology)
 Joscha Bach (cognitive science)
 Frederic Bartlett (psychology, social anthropology)
 Justin L. Barrett (cognitive psychology, cognitive anthropology)
 Marc Bekoff (biology, cognitive ethology, behavioral ecology)
 Maurice Bloch (cognitive anthropology)
 Maggie Boden (cognitive science)
 Pascal Boyer (cognitive anthropology)
 Per Aage Brandt (cognitive semiotics)
 Brian Butterworth (speech, dyslexia, mathematics)
 Michael Cole (comparative cognition, cognitive psychology, cultural psychology)
 Frederick L. Coolidge (evolutionary cognitive archaeology, cognitive evolution, behavior genetics)
 Roy D'Andrade (cognitive anthropology)
 Terrence Deacon (neuroanthropology, linguistics)
 Merlin Donald (psychology, anthropology, historical evolution of cognition)
 Fernando Flores (computer science, philosophy)
 John Gowlett (evolutionary cognitive archaeology, evolutionary anthropology)
 Christopher Robert Hallpike (anthropology)
 Yuval Noah Harari (cognitive evolution, philosophy of artificial intelligence)
 Brian Hare (evolutionary anthropology, evolution of cognition)
 Friedrich Hayek (cognitive psychology, philosophy of perception)
 Cecilia Heyes (cognitive evolution)
 Ludwig Huber (cognitive evolution, cognitive biology)
 Thomas Huffman (ideational cognitive archaeology)
 Edwin Hutchins (cognitive anthropology)
 Paul Jorion (anthropology, sociology)
 George Lakoff (linguistic anthropology)
 Jean Lave (situated cognition, social anthropology)
 Stephen C. Levinson (linguistics, anthropology, psychology)
 David Lewis-Williams (ideational cognitive archaeology)
 Aleksandr Luria (psychology, neuroscience, anthropology)
 Lambros Malafouris (evolutionary cognitive archaeology, philosophy of mind)
 Humberto Maturana (neuroscience, biology of cognition, philosophy)
 Douglas Medin (cognitive psychology, anthropology)
 Steven Mithen (ideational cognitive archaeology)
 Rafael E. Núñez (philosophy of mathematics, linguistics, anthropology)
 Karenleigh A. Overmann (evolutionary cognitive archaeology, cognitive evolution, ethnomathematics, numeracy, literacy)
 Zenon Pylyshyn (engineering, psychology, philosophy)
 Naomi Quinn  (cognitive anthropology)
 Colin Renfrew (evolutionary cognitive archaeology, neuroarchaeology)
 Bradd Shore (cognitive anthropology)
 Richard Shweder (cognitive anthropology)
 Dan Sperber (cognitive anthropology)
 Joshua Tenenbaum (computer science, psychology)
 Hideto Tomabechi (brain science, psychophysics, bioinformatics, intelligent informatics, speech recognition, cognitive neuro-engineering)
 Francisco Varela (neuroscience, philosophy)
 Frans de Waal (ethology, primatology, psychology)
 Étienne Wenger (situated cognition, education)
 James V. Wertsch (cognitive psychology, cultural anthropology)
 Douglas White (anthropology)
 Harvey Whitehouse (social anthropology, cognitive psychology, cultural psychology)
 Richard Wrangham (evolutionary anthropology)
 Thomas G. Wynn (evolutionary cognitive archaeology, cognitive evolution, neuroaesthetics)
 Eviatar Zerubavel (cognitive sociology)

See also 
 List of cognitive neuroscientists
 List of cognitive psychologists
 List of computer scientists
 List of Jean Nicod Prize laureates
 List of linguists
 List of neuroscientists
 List of philosophers
 Thinking-related topics

List of cognitive scientists
Cognitive scientists